Bohlinia is an extinct genus of the artiodactyl family Giraffidae that lived during the Late Miocene in Europe and Africa. It was first named by the paleontologist Dr. W. Matthew in 1929, and contains two species, B. adoumi and B. attica.  The species B. attica has been reclassified several times since its description being first named Camelopardalis attica and then reclassified as Giraffa attica.

References 

Miocene mammals of Africa
Miocene mammals of Europe
Miocene mammals of Asia
Prehistoric giraffes
Fossil taxa described in 1929
Prehistoric even-toed ungulate genera